KLOQ-FM (98.7 FM, "Radio Lobo 98.7") is a radio station broadcasting a Regional Mexican format. Licensed to Winton, California, United States, it serves the Merced, California, area.  The station is owned by Stephens Media Group, through licensee SMG-Merced, LLC.  Its studios are in Merced and its transmitter is located west of Merced.

History
This station signed on in 1996. The station has kept the same callsign throughout its history. It was acquired by Mapleton Communications in 2002.

Acquisition by Stephens Media
On July 1, 2019, Mapleton Communications announced its intent to sell its remaining 37 stations to Stephens Media Group. Stephens began operating the station that same day. The sale was consummated on September 30, 2019, at a price of $21 million.

Sources

External links

LOQ-FM
Regional Mexican radio stations in the United States
LOQ-FM
Mass media in Merced County, California